Ephestia columbiella is a species of snout moth in the genus Ephestia. It was described by Herbert H. Neunzig in 1990 and is known from North America, including Alabama, Florida, South Carolina and West Virginia.

References

Bugguide.net. Species Ephestia columbiella - Hodges#6020.1

Moths described in 1990
Phycitini